Intermittent explosive disorder (sometimes abbreviated as IED) is a behavioral disorder characterized by explosive outbursts of anger and/or violence, often to the point of rage, that are disproportionate to the situation at hand (e.g., impulsive shouting, screaming or excessive reprimanding triggered by relatively inconsequential events). Impulsive aggression is not premeditated, and is defined by a disproportionate reaction to any provocation, real or perceived. Some individuals have reported affective changes prior to an outburst, such as tension, mood changes, energy changes, etc.

The disorder is currently categorized in the Diagnostic and Statistical Manual of Mental Disorders (DSM-5) under the "Disruptive, Impulse-Control, and Conduct Disorders" category. The disorder itself is not easily characterized and often exhibits comorbidity with other mood disorders, particularly bipolar disorder. Individuals diagnosed with IED report their outbursts as being brief (lasting less than an hour), with a variety of bodily symptoms (sweating, stuttering, chest tightness, twitching, palpitations) reported by a third of one sample. Aggressive acts are frequently reported to be accompanied by a sensation of relief and in some cases pleasure, but often followed by later remorse.

Pathophysiology

Impulsive behavior, and especially impulsive violence predisposition, have been correlated to a low brain serotonin turnover rate, indicated by a low concentration of 5-hydroxyindoleacetic acid (5-HIAA) in the cerebrospinal fluid (CSF).  This substrate appears to act on the suprachiasmatic nucleus in the hypothalamus, which is the target for serotonergic output from the dorsal and median raphe nuclei playing a role in maintaining the circadian rhythm and regulation of blood sugar.  A tendency towards low 5-HIAA may be hereditary.  A putative hereditary component to low CSF 5-HIAA and concordantly possibly to impulsive violence has been proposed.  Other traits that correlate with IED are low vagal tone and increased insulin secretion.  A suggested explanation for IED is a polymorphism of the gene for tryptophan hydroxylase, which produces a serotonin precursor; this genotype is found more commonly in individuals with impulsive behavior.

IED may also be associated with damage or lesions in the prefrontal cortex, with damage to these areas, including the amygdala and hippocampus, increasing the incidences of impulsive and aggressive behavior and the inability to predict the outcomes of an individual's own actions.  Lesions in these areas are also associated with improper blood sugar control, leading to decreased brain function in these areas, which are associated with planning and decision making.  A national sample in the United States estimated that 16 million Americans may fit the criteria for IED.

Diagnosis

DSM-5 diagnosis
The current DSM-5 criteria for Intermittent Explosive Disorder include:
 Recurrent outbursts that demonstrate an inability to control impulses, including either of the following:
 Verbal aggression (tantrums, verbal arguments, or fights) or physical aggression that occurs twice in a week-long period for at least three months and does not lead to the destruction of property or physical injury (Criterion A1)
 Three outbursts that involve injury or destruction within a year-long period (Criterion A2)
 Aggressive behavior is grossly disproportionate to the magnitude of the psychosocial stressors (Criterion B)
 The outbursts are not premeditated and serve no premeditated purpose (Criterion C)
 The outbursts cause distress or impairment of functioning or lead to financial or legal consequences (Criterion D)
 The individual must be at least six years old (Criterion E)
 The recurrent outbursts cannot be explained by another mental disorder and are not the result of another medical disorder or substance use (Criterion F)

It is important to note that DSM-5 now includes two separate criteria for types of aggressive outbursts (A1 and A2) which have empirical support:
 Criterion A1: Episodes of verbal and/or non-damaging, nondestructive, or non-injurious physical assault that occur, on average, twice weekly for three months. These could include temper tantrums, tirades, verbal arguments/fights, or assault without damage. This criterion includes high frequency/low-intensity outbursts.
 Criterion A2: More severe destructive/assaultive episodes which are more infrequent and occur, on average, three times within a twelve-month period. These could be destroying an object without regard to value, assaulting an animal or individual. This criterion includes high-intensity/low-frequency outbursts.

DSM-IV diagnosis
The past DSM-IV criteria for IED were similar to the current criteria, however, verbal aggression was not considered as part of the diagnostic criteria. The DSM-IV diagnosis was characterized by the occurrence of discrete episodes of failure to resist aggressive impulses that result in violent assault or destruction of property. Additionally, the degree of aggressiveness expressed during an episode should be grossly disproportionate to provocation or precipitating psychosocial stressor, and, as previously stated, diagnosis is made when certain other mental disorders have been ruled out, e.g., a head injury, Alzheimer's disease, etc., or due to substance use or medication. Diagnosis is made using a psychiatric interview to affective and behavioral symptoms to the criteria listed in the DSM-IV.

The DSM-IV-TR was very specific in its definition of Intermittent Explosive Disorder which was defined, essentially, by the exclusion of other conditions. The diagnosis required:
 several episodes of impulsive behavior that result in serious damage to either persons or property, wherein
 the degree of the aggressiveness is grossly disproportionate to the circumstances or provocation, and
 the episodic violence cannot be better accounted for by another mental or physical medical condition.

Differential diagnosis

Many psychiatric disorders and some substance use disorders are associated with increased aggression and are frequently comorbid with IED, often making differential diagnosis difficult. Individuals with IED are, on average, four times more likely to develop depression or anxiety disorders, and three times more likely to develop substance use disorders.
Bipolar disorder has been linked to increased agitation and aggressive behavior in some individuals, but for these individuals, aggressiveness is limited to manic and/or depressive episodes, whereas individuals with IED experience aggressive behavior even during periods with a neutral or positive mood. 

In one clinical study, the two disorders co-occurred 60% of the time. Patients report manic-like symptoms occurring just before outbursts and continuing throughout. According to a study, the average onset age of IED was around five years earlier than the onset age of bipolar disorder, indicating a possible correlation between the two.

Similarly, alcoholism and other substance use disorders may exhibit increased aggressiveness, but unless this aggression is experienced outside of periods of acute intoxication and withdrawal, no diagnosis of IED is given. For chronic disorders, such as PTSD, it is important to assess whether the level of aggression met IED criteria before the development of another disorder. In antisocial personality disorder, interpersonal aggression is usually instrumental in nature (i.e., motivated by tangible rewards), whereas IED is more of an impulsive, unpremeditated reaction to situational stress.

Treatment
Although there is no cure, treatment is attempted through cognitive behavioral therapy and psychotropic medication regimens, though the pharmaceutical options have shown limited success.  Therapy aids in helping the patient recognize the impulses in hopes of achieving a level of awareness and control of the outbursts, along with treating the emotional stress that accompanies these episodes.  Multiple drug regimens are frequently indicated for IED patients. Cognitive Relaxation and Coping Skills Therapy (CRCST) has shown preliminary success in both group and individual settings compared to waitlist control groups. This therapy consists of 12 sessions, the first three focusing on relaxation training, then cognitive restructuring, then exposure therapy. The final sessions focus on resisting aggressive impulses and other preventative measures.

In France, antipsychotics such as cyamemazine, levomepromazine and loxapine are sometimes used.

Tricyclic antidepressants and selective serotonin reuptake inhibitors (SSRIs, including fluoxetine, fluvoxamine, and sertraline) appear to alleviate some pathopsychological symptoms.  GABAergic mood stabilizers and anticonvulsive drugs such as gabapentin, lithium, carbamazepine, and divalproex seem to aid in controlling the incidence of outbursts. Anxiolytics help alleviate tension and may help reduce explosive outbursts by increasing the provocative stimulus tolerance threshold, and are especially indicated in patients with comorbid obsessive-compulsive or other anxiety disorders.

Epidemiology
Two epidemiological studies of community samples approximated the lifetime prevalence of IED to be 4–6%, depending on the criteria set used. A Ukrainian study found comparable rates of lifetime IED (4.2%), suggesting that a lifetime prevalence of IED of 4–6% is not limited to American samples. One-month and one-year point prevalences of IED in these studies were reported as 2.0% and 2.7%, respectively. Extrapolating to the national level, 16.2 million Americans would have IED during their lifetimes and as many as 10.5 million in any year and 6 million in any month.

Among a clinical population, a 2005 study found the lifetime prevalence of IED to be 6.3%.

Prevalence appears to be higher in men than in women.

Of US subjects with IED, 67.8% had engaged in direct interpersonal aggression, 20.9% in threatened interpersonal aggression, and 11.4% in aggression against objects. Subjects reported engaging in 27.8 high-severity aggressive acts during their worst year, with 2–3 outbursts requiring medical attention. Across the lifespan, the mean value of property damage due to aggressive outbursts was $1603.

A study in the March 2016 Journal of Clinical Psychiatry suggests a relationship between infection with the parasite Toxoplasma gondii and psychiatric aggression such as IED.

History
In the first edition of the American Psychiatric Association's Diagnostic and Statistical Manual (DSM-I), a disorder of impulsive aggression was referred to as a passive-aggressive personality type (aggressive type). This construct was characterized by a "persistent reaction to frustration are "generally excitable, aggressive, and over-responsive to environmental pressures" with "gross outbursts of rage or of verbal or physical aggressiveness different from their usual behavior".

In the third edition (DSM-III), this was for the first time codified as intermittent explosive disorder and assigned clinical disorder status under Axis I. However, some researchers saw the criteria as poorly operationalized. About 80% of individuals who would now be diagnosed with the disorder would have been excluded.

In the DSM-IV, the criteria were improved but still lacked objective criteria for the intensity, frequency, and nature of aggressive acts to meet criteria for IED. This led some researchers to adopt alternate criteria set with which to conduct research, known as the IED-IR (Integrated Research).  The severity and frequency of aggressive behavior required for the diagnosis were clearly operationalized, the aggressive acts were required to be impulsive in nature, subjective distress was required to precede the explosive outbursts, and the criteria allowed for comorbid diagnoses with borderline personality disorder and antisocial personality disorder. These research criteria became the basis for the DSM-5 diagnosis.

In the current version of the DSM (DSM-5), the disorder appears under the "Disruptive, Impulse-Control, and Conduct Disorders" category. In the DSM-IV, physical aggression was required to meet the criteria for the disorder, but these criteria were modified in the DSM-5 to include verbal aggression and non-destructive/noninjurious physical aggression. The listing was also updated to specify frequency criteria. Further, aggressive outbursts are now required to be impulsive in nature and must cause marked distress, impairment, or negative consequences for the individual. Individuals must be at least six years old to receive the diagnosis. The text also clarified the disorder's relationship to other disorders such as ADHD and disruptive mood dysregulation disorder.

See also
 Episodic dyscontrol syndrome
 Passive–aggressive personality disorder

References

External links 

Types of mental disorders
Rage (emotion)